National freeway 3A (native:國道三號甲線;三甲) is a spur of national freeway 3 for connection of downtown Taipei City. It begins south of downtown Taipei City at the intersection of Xinhai Road and Fanglan Road, near National Taiwan University, and ends in Shenkeng, New Taipei City on municipal highway 106B. It's tolled as it is the spur of National freeway 3.

Length
The total length is 5.6 km.

Major Cities Along the Route
Taipei City
New Taipei City

Places Along The Highway
Taipei City ( Daan District)      大安區 (Daan District)
Taipei City ( Rural Wenshan District) (Has Countyway 106 to go to the urban part of Wenshan District (Muzha and Jingmei)
New Taipei City (Shenkeng District(Originally Shenkeng Township)

Exit List

Lanes
The freeway has 2 lanes in each direction for its entire length.

See also
 Highway system in Taiwan

Notes
Completed in March 1996.

References

 Taiwan Area National Freeway Bureau

1996 establishments in Taiwan
Freeway 3A